Plancher-les-Mines is a commune in the Haute-Saône department in the region of Bourgogne-Franche-Comté in eastern France. It is a small village close to the ski station at La Planche des Belles Filles. There is one elementary school located near the church, and a small cinema.

See also
Communes of the Haute-Saône department

References

Communes of Haute-Saône
Haute-Saône communes articles needing translation from French Wikipedia